Higienópolis is a neighbourhood of São Paulo, Brazil.

Higienópolis may also refer to:
 Higienópolis, Rio de Janeiro, a borough in Rio de Janeiro
 Higienópolis, Rio Grande do Sul, a borough in Porto Alegre